The Healthcare Quality Improvement Partnership (HQIP) was established in April 2008 to promote improvement in health services, by increasing the impact that clinical audit has on healthcare quality in England and Wales and, in some cases other devolved nations. It is led by a consortium of the Academy of Medical Royal Colleges, Royal College of Nursing and National Voices.

The Partnership holds the contract to commission, manage, and develop the National Clinical Audit and Patient Outcomes Programme (NCAPOP). This consists of more than 40 clinical audits, registries and confidential enquiries that cover a range of medical, surgical and mental health conditions. Their purpose is to engage clinicians in systematic evaluation of their clinical practice against standards (often set by NICE), and to encourage improvement in the quality of care. This programme is gradually being extended to other areas of healthcare, working with clinical, patient and professional advisory groups.

HQIP also hosts the National Joint Registry which was set up to collect information in England and Wales on joint replacement operations and to monitor the performances of implants, hospitals and surgeons. Additionally, the Partnership works closely with a number of national and professional leadership bodies and organisations including the Care Quality Commission (CQC), National Institute of Health and Care Excellence (NICE), NHS England/Improvement, NHS Digital, Health Data Research UK, the Health Foundation, the Independent Healthcare Providers Network and the Private Healthcare Information Network, among others. 

The Chief Executive Officer is Jane Ingham. The Trustee Board of HQIP includes the following members: Professor Carrie MacEwen - chair, Alistair Henderson - vice chair, Phil Baker, Peter Bloomfield, Victoria Tzortziou Brown, Sarah Dunnett, Michael Chapman, Gill Coverdale, Janie Gabriel, Susan Masters, Miles Sibley.

National Clinical Audits 
Adult Diabetes: National Diabetes Foot Care
Adult Diabetes: National Diabetes Inpatient Audit
Adult Diabetes: National Diabetes Transition 
Adult Diabetes: National Pregnancy in Diabetes
Adult Diabetes: National Core Diabetes Audit
Anxiety and Depression - decommissioned in July 2020
Breast Cancer in Older Patients
Cardiovascular Disease Prevention Audit, CVDPREVENT-commissioned Feb 2021
Care at the End of Life
Chronic Obstructive Pulmonary Disease with Asthma: COPD secondary care
Chronic Obstructive Pulmonary Disease with Asthma: Pulmonary rehabilitation 
Chronic Obstructive Pulmonary Disease with Asthma: Adult asthma
Chronic Obstructive Pulmonary Disease with Asthma: Paediatric asthma 
Chronic Obstructive Pulmonary Disease with Asthma: Primary care (Wales only) 
Dementia: Care in General Hospitals
Emergency Laparotomy 
Falls and Fragility Fracture: Fracture Liaison Service Database
Falls and Fragility Fracture: Inpatient Falls
Falls and Fragility Fracture: National hip fracture database
Lung Cancer 
Maternal and Perinatal
National Cardiac Audit Programme: Adult Cardiac Surgery 
National Cardiac Audit Programme: Congenital Heart Disease Audit 
National Cardiac Audit Programme: Heart Failure Audit 
National Cardiac Audit Programme: Heart Rhythm Management Audit 
National Cardiac Audit Programme: Myocardial Ischemia Audit Programme 
National Cardiac Audit Programme: Percutaneous Cardiac Intervention Audit 
National Gastro-intestinal Cancer Audit: Bowel Cancer Audit 
National Gastro-intestinal Cancer Audit: Oesophago-Gastric Cancer Audit 
National Joint Registry (UK)
National Vascular Registry
National Neonatal Audit Programme
Paediatric Diabetes
Paediatric Intensive Care Audit 
Prostate Cancer Audit 
Psychosis Audit 
Early Inflammatory Arthritis Audit 
Seizures and Epilepsy in Children and Young People 
Sentinel Stroke Audit Programme

Clinical Outcome Review Programmes 

 Mental Health 
 Child Health 
 Medical and Surgical 
 Maternal and Newborn Infant

Mortality Review Programme 

 Learning Disability - decommissioned in May 2020
 National Child Mortality Database

Non-NCAPOP Commissions 

 Perinatal Mortality Review Tool

A list of all former HQIP programmes is available on the HQIP website.

References

External links

Medical associations based in the United Kingdom
National Health Service (England)
Health care quality